The 2009–10 UCLA Bruins men's basketball team represented University of California, Los Angeles  during the 2009–10 NCAA Division I men's basketball season. The Bruins were led by head coach Ben Howland and played their home games at Pauley Pavilion. They finished the season 14–18, 8–10 in Pac-10 play and lost in the semifinals of the 2010 Pacific-10 Conference men's basketball tournament. They were not invited to a post season tournament.

Recruiting class
 In November 2009, five student-athletes signed a national letters of intent to attend UCLA. They are Tyler Honeycutt, a 6-foot-8-inch, 190-pound guard/forward out of Sylmar, Calif. (Sylmar HS); Brendan Lane, a 6-foot-10-inch, 205-pound forward from Rocklin, Calif. (Rocklin HS); Mike Moser, a 6-foot-7-inch, 185 pound forward out of Portland, Oregon (Grant HS); Reeves Nelson, a 6-foot-7-inch, 220-pound forward out of Modesto, Calif. (Modesto Christian HS) and Anthony Stover, a 6-foot-10-inch, 210-pound center from La Cañada, Calif. (Windward HS).
 Tyler Lamb, Mater Dei's 6'4", 190-pound shooting guard, and Josh Smith, a 6'10", 280-pound center from Kentwood, have signed a letter of intent to play for UCLA next season. Lazeric Jones, of John A. Logan College, in Carterville, Illinois, is 6'1", 195 pounds, and he will be a junior for UCLA next year.

Roster

Schedule

|-
!colspan=9 style=|Exhibition

|-
!colspan=9 style=|Non-Conference Season

|-
!colspan=9 style=| Conference Season

|-
!colspan=9 style=| Pac-10 Tournament

See also
 2009–10 NCAA Division I men's basketball rankings

Notes
 Freshman Jrue Holiday left the team to go to the NBA. Seniors Darren Collison, Josh Shipp and Alfred Aboya graduated.
 14 former UCLA players are on the NBA teams on opening day.
 Starter power forward Nikola Dragovic, who averaged 9.4points per game, is returning.
 November 20, 2009 – Dragovic was suspended for the November 20 and 23 games after the Los Angeles County District Attorney filed felony assault charges for an off-court altercation at a Hollywood concert.
 November 26, 2009 – UCLA's worst defeat in the Ben Howland era.
 November 29, 2009 - Long Beach State's first ever win over UCLA.
 December 1, 2009 - Head coach Ben Howland announced that by mutual agreement, sophomore forward Drew Gordon has left the team. Gordon would transfer at the end of the school quarter.
 Feb. 18, 2010 – Senior forward James Keefe's career at UCLA ends with a left shoulder injury.
 July 13, 2010 - Mustafa Abdul-Hamid has been named a recipient of the Pac-10 Postgraduate Scholarship for 2009-10.

References

UCLA Bruins men's basketball seasons
UCLA
NCAA
NCAA